Gheorghiţa Munteanu (born 3 September 1980) is a Romanian rower. He competed in the men's coxless four event at the 2004 Summer Olympics.

References

1980 births
Living people
Romanian male rowers
Olympic rowers of Romania
Rowers at the 2004 Summer Olympics
Sportspeople from Vaslui